This is a list of women writers who were born in Luxembourg or whose writings are closely associated with that country.

Anne Beffort (1880–1966), educator, literary scholar and writer, supported French culture in Luxembourg
Carole Dieschbourg (born 1977), politician and non-fiction writer
Anise Koltz (born 1928), prominent poet writing mainly in French and German
José Ensch (1942–2008), poet, wrote in French
Anne Faber (graduated 2006), journalist, chef, cookbook writer, television personality
Germaine Goetzinger (born 1947), writer, historian, educator and feminist
Josiane Kartheiser (born 1950), journalist, novelist, children's writer, German and Luxembourgish
Anna Leader (born 1996), poet, novelist, writing in English
Marianne Majerus (born 1956), photographer, writer, specializing in works on gardens, writing in English, French and German
Claudine Muno (born 1979), novelist, children's writer, playwright, writing in English, French, German and Luxembourgish
Monique Philippart (born 1955), children's writer, writing in German
Nathalie Ronvaux (born 1977), poet, playwright
Germaine Simon (1921–2012), novelist, short story writer
Margret Steckel (born 1934), German-born Luxembourg novelist, columnist, translator, writing in German
Marie Henriette Steil (1898–1930), short story writer
Ketty Thull (1905–1987), cook, educator, cookbook writer
Lily Unden (1908–1989), poet and painter
Nora Wagener (born 1989), short story writer, novelist, playwright, children's writer, writing mainly in German

See also
List of women writers

Writers
Writers, women
Luxembourgian